Enteucha is a genus of moths of the family Nepticulidae.

Species 

Enteucha acetosae (Stainton, 1854)
Enteucha acuta Puplesis & Diškus, 2002
Enteucha basidactyla (Davis, 1978) 
Enteucha contracolorea Puplesis & Robinson, 2000
Enteucha cyanochlora (Meyrick, 1915) 
Enteucha diplocosma  (Meyrick, 1921) 
Enteucha gilvafascia (Davis, 1978) 
Enteucha guajavae Puplesis & Diškus, 2002
Enteucha hilli Puplesis & Robinson, 2000
Enteucha snaddoni Puplesis & Robinson, 2000
Enteucha terricula Puplesis & Robinson, 2000
Enteucha trinaria (Puplesis & Robinson, 2000)

External links
Euteucha  images at  Consortium for the Barcode of Life

Nepticulidae
Monotrysia genera
Taxa named by Edward Meyrick